Scott Peak is an  summit in the Caribou-Targhee National Forest, in Lemhi County, Idaho in the United States. It is the highest point of the Beaverhead Mountains, and is located in the "Italian Peaks" section of the range.

See also
List of mountain peaks of Idaho

References

Mountains of Lemhi County, Idaho
North American 3000 m summits